Heaven to a Tortured Mind is the fourth studio album by American experimental electronic artist Yves Tumor, released April 3, 2020.

Background
The album was announced alongside the release of the single "Gospel for a New Century" on February 18, 2020. Two more singles followed, "Kerosene!" which was released on March 9, 2020, and "Romanticist / Dream Palette", which was released March 31, 2020.

Critical reception

Heaven to a Tortured Mind received widespread acclaim from music critics. At Metacritic, which assigns a normalized rating out of 100 to reviews from mainstream critics, the album has an average score of 88 based on 18 reviews, indicating "universal acclaim". AllMusic critic Heather Phares praised the record, describing it as "an album that suggests the easiest way to define Tumor is as an artist who consistently outdoes themself." Eero Holi of Clash labeled the album as a "psychedelic soul record for the 21st century," further stating: "It’s so heart-rending you could keep yourself wrapped inside its comfort for hours and not come out." Kaelen Bell of Exclaim! characterized the music as "the sound of a new kind of warped pop star — an artist capable of weaving the unending unknown of space and the throb of blood and skin, willing to take us and destroy us and create something wholly new from what remains."

Alexis Petridis of The Guardian thought that the record "sounds coherent" and "is punchy and concise;" Petridis further remarked that "its stylistic leaps and short-circuits always feel intended – the product of someone operating to their own internal logic rather than randomly throwing ideas at the wall." Paste critic Austin Jones praised the record, stating: "The record, with all its idiosyncrasies, will be remembered as a definitive piece by one of our era’s most important rock icons—a pop star as transgressive and rule-breaking as the legends of the ’70s and ’80s we take for granted now." Pitchforks Kevin Lozano considered Tumor's commercial ambition, writing: "The product of this ambition is a gratifying and intense record, one whose pleasures are viscerally immediate." Reviewing for PopMatters, Paul Carr noted: "Whereas on previous albums, he would obscure himself behind the music, here he steps out of his sonic chrysalis, dons some shiny black wings and soars." Qs Leonie Cooper likewise noted the album's "relatively straight-up approach", dubbing it "sleazy listening at its best".

Accolades

Track listing

Sample credits
 "Gospel for New Century" contains elements from "이송아," performed by Lee Son Ga
 "Kerosene" contains elements from "Weep in Silence," written by Ken Hensley and John Wetton 
 "Romanticist" contains elements from "김남미 - 오! 그말," performed by Kim Nam Mi; and the composition "Hangman," written by Roy Harper and Jimmy Page
 "Dream Palette" contains elements from "A Love That's Worth Having," written and performed by Willie Hutch
 "Super Stars" contains elements from the composition "Three Piece Suit," written by Robert Webb, Martin Henderson, and Frank Holland
 “Asteroid Blues” contains a sample from the 1998 PlayStation game Metal Gear Solid

Personnel
Album personnel adapted from Bandcamp liner notes.
Yves Tumor – vocals, writer, composer, performer, producer
Hirakish – vocals (8, 12)
Pan Daijing – additional vocals (1)
Diana Gordon – additional vocals (4)
Kelsey Lu – additional vocals (6)
Julia Cumming – additional vocals (7, 10)
Clara La San – additional vocals (12)
Yves Rothman – synthesizer (4, 6, 8), bass guitar (5), additional programming (1, 4–8, 10), co-producer, engineer, editor
Joe Kennedy – guitar (1, 4, 8), bass guitar (4, 7, 11, 12), organ (4, 8), drum machine (6), synth (6, 8, 12), Mellotron (12)
Heavy Mellow – guitar (1, 4, 6, 8, 12)
Andreas Emanuel – guitar (3, 9, 12)
Kenny Gilmore – guitar (2, 6), synth (2)
Andy Ramsay – guitar (1), drums (1), effects (1)
Gina Ramirez – bass guitar (1-3, 6-8)
Henry Schiff – drums (1, 3, 4, 6–8, 11, 12)
Sylvain Carton – tenor saxophone, baritone saxophone, flute, clarinet (1, 3)

Production
Justin Raisen – executive producer, engineer, synth (2, 8, 12), additional drums (10)
Mahssa Taghinia – executive producer
Anthony Paul Lopez – engineer, drums (10)
Ben Zelico – editor
Collin Dupuis – mixing
Mike Bozzi – mastering

Charts

References

External links
 

2020 albums
Albums produced by Justin Raisen
Warp (record label) albums
Rock albums by American artists
Psychedelic soul albums
Yves Tumor albums